The 2013–14 Burundi Ligue A season, also known as the Amstel Ligue for sponsorship reasons, was the 51st edition of the top flight football competition in Burundi. The season began on 21 December 2013 and was ended on 6 July 2014. Flambeau de l’Est the champions from the previous season were stripped of their title due to match fixing, and LLB Académic were awarded the title.

Teams 
A total of fourteen clubs participate in this season. Twelve teams from previous season and two new promoted sides.

Promoted from Ligue B
 Guêpiers du Lac
 Volontaires

Relegated from Ligue A
 ―

Stadiums and locations

League table

References

External links
Soccerway
 Official Website

Burundi Premier League seasons
Premier League
Premier League
Burundi